Henrique Alvim Corrêa (30 January 1876 – 7 June 1910) was a Brazilian illustrator of military and science fiction books. He was born in Rio de Janeiro, and died in Brussels. He is best known for his illustrations of a French translation of H. G. Wells's novel The War of the Worlds.

Biography
Corrêa went to live in Europe in 1892 at the age of 16, shortly after the proclamation of the Republic in Brazil, taken by José Mendes de Oliveira Castro, the royalist Baron of Oliveira Castro, his stepfather. 

In 1903, he executed a series of 132 notable illustrations, 32 of which were inserted in the book The War of the Worlds, by H. G. Wells, to whom he personally requested authorization. After the author's approval in 1905, who considers the work superior to that of Warwick Goble, Corrêa's work was published in a luxury edition printed in 500 copies in 1906 by L. Vandamme & Cie in a French translation by HD Davray. All of these illustrations are the strength of his work. In Brazil, his work is generally classified as being Pre-Modernist.

The Belgian edition received a special circulation of 500 copies. He built a press in his Watermael-Boitsfort studio. He also produced artistic works on military life, mainly on the Franco-Prussian War (1870-1871). He also produced other works of an erotic nature, signed as "Henri LeMort". In the composition of some of these works, Blanche, his future wife, posed as a model. Part of his work got lost. In 1914, when Germany invaded Belgium during World War I, part of his drawings were stolen or destroyed. 

In 1942, during World War II, some of his illustrations were lost when the ship that transported them to Brazil sank, torpedoed by a German submarine. The first public exhibition of his work happened in 1972 at the São Paulo Museum of Art (MASP). Others would follow, such as those of 1977 and 1990, at the National Museum of Fine Arts, and that of 1981, at the Casa de Rui Barbosa Foundation, both in the city of Rio de Janeiro. In 2004, his work was exhibited at the Science Fiction Museum (EMP Museum), in Seattle, USA, on the occasion of its inauguration. In 2016 his work was presented at the contemporary art exhibition Ulla, Ulla, Ulla! Martians, Aliens, Intergalactics and Humans  at the Casanova Gallery in São Paulo. In 1985, Alvim's engravings depicting nude and/or abused women were included in the book Baco e Anas brasileira, by the Goetian poet Yêda Schmaltz.

Henrique Alvim Corrêa died in 1910, at the age of 34 and his body was transferred to Brazil, being buried in the city of Rio de Janeiro.

Exhibitions

 1972 – São Paulo. Museu de Arte “Assis Chateaubriand” (MASP).
 1973 – Rio de Janeiro. Museu de Arte Moderna (MAM)
 2001 – Lisbonne, Fondation Gulbenkian, “Século 20 Arte do Brasil”.
 2004–2007 - Seattle, Science Fiction Museum and Hall of Fame (SFM).
 2008–2009 - Frankfurt, Darwin - Art and the Search for Origins.
 2016 - São Paulo, Casanova Art Space, "Ulla, Ulla, Ulla, Ulla! Martians, Aliens, Intergalactics and Humans"

References

External links

 

1876 births
1910 deaths
20th-century Brazilian artists
20th-century Brazilian male artists
Science fiction artists
Brazilian speculative fiction artists
Brazilian illustrators